Donald Johnson and Piet Norval defeated Mahesh Bhupathi and Leander Paes in the final, 7–6(10–8), 6–3, 6–4 to win the doubles tennis title at the 2000 ATP Tour World Championships.

Sébastien Lareau and Alex O'Brien were the reigning champions, but did not compete together in 2000. Lareau failed to qualify with another partner, while O'Brien qualified with Jared Palmer, but was eliminated in the round-robin stage.

Seeds

Draw

Finals

Red group
Standings are determined by: 1. number of wins; 2. number of matches; 3. in two-players-ties, head-to-head records; 4. in three-players-ties, percentage of sets won, or of games won; 5. steering-committee decision.

Gold group
Standings are determined by: 1. number of wins; 2. number of matches; 3. in two-players-ties, head-to-head records; 4. in three-players-ties, percentage of sets won, or of games won; 5. steering-committee decision.

External links
 Draw

Doubles
2000 in Indian tennis
Sports competitions in Bangalore
2000s in Bangalore
Tennis tournaments in India